Isaac Mattia Mokonzi (born 1 January 1988) is a South Sudanese footballer who plays as a midfielder for Kator FC and the South Sudan national football team.

Career

International
Mattia made his senior international debut on 30 May 2014, in a 0-0 draw with Mozambique during qualifying for the 2015 Africa Cup of Nations. He  was included in South Sudan's squad for the 2015 CECAFA Cup, appearing in all three group stage matches against Djibouti, Sudan, and Malawi.

Career statistics

International

References

External links

Isaac Mattia at Football Database

1988 births
Living people
South Sudanese footballers
South Sudan international footballers
Association football midfielders